Shamrock Gaels is a Gaelic Athletic Association club based in the east of County Sligo, Republic of Ireland, including the parishes of Riverstown, Sooey, Gleann and Castlebaldwin. It was formed in March 1972 when two clubs, Sooey and Knockalassa, amalgamated.

As of 2022, it was a Sligo Senior Football Championship club. They celebrated their fiftieth birthday that year, with RTÉ TV's Pat Spillane a guest of theirs. Pat also spoke highly of Shamrock Gaels Legendary defender Michael Hannon.

Notable players
Frank Henry, won a Connacht Senior Football Championship with Sligo in 1975
Evan Lyons
Michael 'Mixer' Hannon

Honours
 Sligo Senior Football Championship: (2)
 1990, 1992
 Sligo Intermediate Football Championship: (2)
 1979, 1985, 2018

 Sligo Junior A Football Championship: (1)
 2022
 Sligo Junior B Football Championship: (1)
 1999
 Sligo Under 20 Football Championship: (4)
 1975, 1987, 1988, 1989
 Sligo Minor Football Championship: (2)
 1972, 1973
 Sligo Under-14 Football Championship: (4)
 1977, 1981, 1983, 1984
 Sligo Senior Football League (Division 1): (1)
 1986
 Sligo Intermediate Football League Division 3 (ex Div. 2): (3)
 1979, 1985, 2000
 Sligo Junior Football League (Division 5): (2)
 1989, 2004
 Kiernan Cup: (3)
 1986, 2000, 2009

References

Gaelic games clubs in County Sligo